The Voice of Poland (season 9) began airing on 1 September 2018 on TVP 2. It aired on Saturdays at 20:05 and 21:10.

Michał Szpak remained as coach this season, but Tomson & Baron, Maria Sadowska and Andrzej Piaseczny resigned from the function of coaches, and their place was taken by: Patrycja Markowska who previously acted as a coach in the second edition.

Coaches and Hosts

Last season's winning coach Michał Szpak is the only returning coach this season. Tomson and Baron, Maria Sadowska and Andrzej Piaseczny resigned from the coaches' functions, and their places were taken over by: Patrycja Markowska, who previously acted as a trainer in the second season of the program. On the other hand, Grzegorz Hyży and Piotr Cugowski debuted in the role of jurors. The hosts remained unchanged: Tomasz Kammel, Maciej Musiał, Krzysztof "Jankes" Jankowski and Barabara Kurdej-Szatan.

Teams
Color key

Blind auditions
Color keys

Episode 1 (September 1, 2018)

Episode 2 (September 1, 2018)

Episode 3 (September 8, 2018)

Episode 4 (September 15, 2018)

Episode 5 (September 15, 2018)

Episode 6 (September 22, 2018)

Episode 7 (September 29, 2018)

Episode 8 (September 29, 2018)

Episode 9 (October 6, 2018)

Episode 10 (October 6, 2018)

 by Bracia (feat. Edyta Bartosiewicz)
 by Wilki
 by Kayah & Grzegorz Hyży
 by Grzegorz Hyży
 by Patrycja Markowska
 by Sarsa
 by Zbigniew Wodecki
 by Bemibek
 by Michał Szpak
 by Mrozu
 by Michał Bajor
 by Kortez
 by Kamil Bednarek
 by Maanam
 by Ania
 by Paweł Domagała
 by Grażyna Łobaszewska

The Battle Rounds
Color keys

 by Anna Jantar
 by Mrozu
 No one won the battle
 by Brodka
 by Ania
 by Czesław Niemen
 by Anita Lipnicka
 by Zalewski (feat. Kortez, Podsiadło)
 by Jamal
 by Lenny Kravitz

The Knockout Round

Episode 14 (November 3, 2018)
Knockouts took place on 3 November 2018.

Color keys

 by Varius Manx
 by Mrozu
 by Kayah
 by Maryla Rodowicz
 by Natalia Szroeder
 by Natalia Przybysz
 by Dawid Podsiadło

Live Shows

Color keys

Episode 15 - Quarter-Final (November 17, 2018)

Episode 16 - Semifinal (November 24, 2018)

Episode 17 - Final (December 1, 2018)

Result details

Results summary of live shows
Color keys
Artist's info

Result details

References

The Voice of Poland
2018 Polish television seasons